is a Japanese actor who is affiliated with CES. He played the role of Ryoga Hakua (Aba Red) in the 2003 Super Sentai TV series Bakuryū Sentai Abaranger.

Biography
Nishi debuted as a model in 2002. In 2003, he starred in Bakuryū Sentai Abaranger as Ryoga Hakua/Aba Red. In 2014, Nishi reprised that role in Zyuden Sentai Kyoryuger vs. Go-Busters: The Great Dinosaur Battle! Farewell Our Eternal Friends. On May 5, 2015, he was married.

Filmography

TV series

Films

References

External links
 Official profile at CES 

Japanese male actors
1979 births
Living people
Actors from Ehime Prefecture